This is a partial list of 21st-century writers. This list includes notable authors, poets, playwrights, philosophers, artists, scientists and other important and noteworthy contributors to literature. Literature (from Latin litterae (plural); letters) is the art of written works. Literally translated, the word literature means "acquaintance with letters" (as in the "arts and letters"). The two most basic written literary categories include fiction and non fiction.

A

B

C

D

E

F

G

I-J

K

L

M

N-O

P-Q

R

S

T

U-W

X-Z
 William P. Young
 Carlos Ruiz Zafón

See also
Lists of writers
List of 20th-century writers
21st century in literature
21st century in poetry
List of years in literature
List of avant-garde artists
Modern Library 100 Best Novels
List of playwrights
List of crime writers
List of authors of erotic works
List of horror fiction writers
List of science fiction authors
List of sports writers
List of fantasy authors
Non-fiction
Fiction
List of writers from peoples indigenous to the Americas

20th-century writers
Writers